Geoffrey Vernon Townsend Matthews  (16 June 1923 – 21 January 2013) was a British ornithologist and conservationist.

Biography
Born on 16 June 1923 and educated at Bedford School and at Christ's College, Cambridge, where he completed his doctorate and post-doctoral research, Geoffrey Matthews was director of research and conservation, 1955–1988, and deputy director, 1973–1988, at the Wildfowl & Wetlands Trust, Slimbridge. He was also a professorial fellow at Bristol University between 1970 and 1990.

Matthews died on 21 January 2013.

Publications

References

Further reading

1923 births
2013 deaths
People educated at Bedford School
Alumni of Christ's College, Cambridge
Officers of the Order of the British Empire
English ornithologists
British ornithologists